The Palestine Children's Relief Fund (PCRF) is a registered 501(c)(3) non-governmental organization established in 1991, by, according to its website, "concerned people in the U.S. to address the medical and humanitarian crisis facing Palestinian youths in the Middle East." The main objective of the PCRF is to locate in the United States and Europe free medical care for children who cannot be adequately treated in the Middle East. Since 1991, tens of thousands of young people have received medical treatment through the PCRF.

The PCRF was founded by Steve Sosebee, who currently serves as the organization's President.

History

1991: Establishment
The Palestine Children's Relief Fund was established in 1991. It was founded by Steve Sosebee, a former journalist who, while on assignment in Hebron, brought Palestinian children in need to Akron, Ohio, to receive free medical care. Sosebee later met Huda al Masry, a Palestinian social worker with the YMCA in Jerusalem. Sosebee and al Masry married in 1993, and had two daughters.

2004–07: Attempted donation by the Holy Land Foundation, and Open Heart
In 2004, the Holy Land Foundation—a group which was shut down by the United States government because it was suspected of funneling donations to terrorist organizations—attempted to make a donation of $50,000 to the PCRF. Steve Sosebee, president of the PCRF, said at the time that if the PCRF received the donation, the money would be used to fund its relief services. That same year, the NBC television film Homeland Security featured a scene in which an investigator refers to the PCRF as a terrorist organization and "a front for Islamic Jihad". As a result, Sosebee received numerous phone calls and e-mails asking about how the PCRF uses its funds.

In 2006, the PCRF, in cooperation with the British Arts Council, produced the 22-minute documentary film Open Heart. Directed by Claire Fowler, the film is about a nine-month-old boy named Jamal with congenital heart disease, and the efforts by his family, a British surgeon, and the PCRF to provide him treatment.

2009–present: Ongoing work
In 2009, al Masry died of cancer, and Sosebee moved to Palestine with his daughters. There, the PCRF built the first public pediatric cancer department in Bethlehem, and named it after al Masry. In 2016, Sosebee married pediatric oncologist Dr. Zeena Salman. In February 2019, the PCRF built a second cancer department, this time in the Gaza Strip.

During the 2021 Israel–Palestine crisis, online streamers and other online content creators on platforms such as Twitch and YouTube held fundraisers in support of the PCRF. On 17 May 2021, Israeli airstrikes damaged PCRF offices in Gaza City.

Humanitarian activities
The Palestine Children's Relief Fund sends medical equipment, supplies, and American medical personnel to the region to treat difficult cases and train Palestinian surgeons. Several injured or sick children are being treated in the U.S. for free. The PCRF relies on volunteers throughout the U.S. who act as host families and donors. The organization also helps suffering children from other Middle Eastern nations, based on medical need. The PCRF has built two pediatric cancer departments in the West Bank and the Gaza Strip. In addition to physical medical care, the PCRF operates a mental health program in Gaza.

Reception
As of September 2009 the PCRF has received a four-star rating by Charity Navigator, an independent evaluator of charities' fiscal management. It has received support and endorsements from U.S. Senator Paul Sarbanes, former U.S. Congressman Albert Wynn, and actor and humanitarian Richard Gere.

In October 2006, former U.S. president Jimmy Carter issued a video endorsement of the organization.

References

External links
 
 PCRF's Financial Value Report
 SF Chronicle piece on the impact sanctions have for U.S. Physicians who provide medical treatment through PCRF
 Charity Navigator page for Palestine Children's Relief Fund

Health charities in the United States
Foreign charities operating in the State of Palestine
Organizations for children with health issues
Health in the State of Palestine
Non-governmental organizations involved in the Israeli–Palestinian conflict
Medical and health organizations based in Ohio
1992 establishments in the United States
Organizations established in 1992